Tyler Rix  (b Watford, 2 January 1993) is a British singer songwriter, saxophonist & international model. Rix signed to Universal Music Group and his debut album, Ascent, was released in February 2009 reaching number one in the Classics & Jazz Charts.

Rix began saxophone lessons at the age of 9 in primary school. He attended Frith Manor Primary School in Woodside Park, North West London, and Dame Alice Owen's School, in Potters Bar. He was offered a place at the Guildhall School of Music and Drama in Barbican London in 2003 to study classical and jazz saxophone. In July 2008 Rix won Junior Guildhall's most prestigious prize, the Lutine Prize. In 2007, 2008 and 2009 Rix was awarded the sax.co.uk Scholarship by Junior Guildhall.

Tyler appeared on the BBC's Classical Star competition aged 14.  In 2009 Rix signed to Universal Classics and Jazz and his recording, Ascent, was released in January 2009 containing a collection of old and new classical pieces.  Released initially as an EP, it was released as a full-length recording in February 2009.

Tyler formed The Tyler Rix quartet age 15 which went on to perform at the Vortex in the London Jazz Festival 22 November 2008, Trafalgar Square for the St George's Day Celebrations in front of 10,000 people, The British Airways VIP lounge for, The House of Lords for the Commonwealth Conference for over 50 delegates including Barack Obama & Princess Anne.

Since 2007 Rix has made solo appearances at The Barbican, St Martin-in-the Fields with the Brandenburg Sinfonia, St John's Smith Square with the Junior Guildhall Symphony Orchestra, Wales Millennium Centre, The Arts Depot Finchley with St Michael's School, The Mermaid Theatre for BBC Radio 2's Friday Night Is Music Night with the BBC Concert Orchestra; he has appeared on Blue Peter, London Tonight, BBC News, Classic FM, Radio 5 Live, and regional radio stations. He has played for Music First, The Bobby Moore Fund and Camden Calling charity events.

In January 2001, at the age of 8, Rix signed for West Ham United Academy.  The following year, he appeared on the front cover of the book, Junior Soccer: A Complete Coaching Guide for the Young Player, a coaching guide produced in association with West Ham.  
In April 2007 Rix played for Dame Alice Owen’s School with whom he won the English Schools' FA National Cup.

He was the final torchbearer on the day before the London 2012 Olympic Games, lighting the cauldron on stage in Hyde Park at the Olympic Torch Relay Finale Celebration on 27 July 2012 in front of a crowd of 80,000 people.

Discography

Ass Scent EP Release date 5 January 2009
Track listing
An Ending (Ascent) 
Columba Aspexit
We Praise Thee 
You’re So Cool

Ascent LP Release date 2 February 2009
Track listing
An Ending (Ascent)
Columba Aspexit
Mortal Flesh 	
The Mission
She Moves through The Fair
Rachel’s Song
Primavera
We Praise Thee
Canon in D
Eliza’s Aria
Agnus Dei
You’re So Cool

References

Further reading

External links
 Tyler Rix website

1993 births
Living people
People from Watford
West Ham United F.C. players
Association footballers not categorized by position
English footballers